The 2005 Batman Begins 400 was a NASCAR NEXTEL Cup Series racing event held on June 19, 2005, at Michigan International Speedway in the American community of Brooklyn, Michigan.

Run over 200 laps, the race was the fifteenth in the 2005 NASCAR Nextel Cup Series season and took place around the time of the controversial 2005 United States Grand Prix that Michael Schumacher would dominate.

Entry list

Practice

Top 10 practice 1 results

Top 10 practice 2 results

Qualifying 

*Had an accident during qualifying

Race recap 
On April 27, 2005 Warner Bros. would announce that the race would be sponsored by the movie Batman Begins, marking the first time a motion picture sponsored a Cup Series race. In a press release, NASCAR CEO and chairman Brian France said "Batman will cheer on the 43 super heroes that will be competing for the Batman Begins 400 at Michigan International Speedway." Along with the sponsorship, the Batmobile served as the honorary pace car for the race, while Batman was the grand marshal, and Karen Newman sang the national anthem. 

Mark Martin also ran a Batman Begins paint scheme, along with Ricky Craven at the Paramount Health Insurance 200 on the previous day. Michigan International Speedway has been a Ford dominated track starting in 1984, and a Mercury track before that from 1969-78. It was also a track that suited a smooth driver or a driver that could change his driving tactics for Michigan International Speedway.

Tony Stewart would dominate the race, he would end up leading a race-high 97 laps. However, on lap 168, Stewart took a four-tire pit stop, while Greg Biffle, Elliott Sadler and  Roush Racing teammates Matt Kenseth, Carl Edwards and Kurt Busch, as they and other drivers had pitted 12 laps earlier; Joe Nemechek and Michael Waltrip also beat Stewart to the track, forcing him to start in eighth on lap 174. Biffle, who led 67 laps, would go on to win his eighth career Cup race and fifth of the season. Stewart was able to fight his way into second, while Mark Martin finished in third. Kenseth and Edwards rounded out the top five. Jeff Gordon and Dale Earnhardt Jr. finished the race in 32nd and 17th, respectively, and were knocked out of contention for the 2005 Chase for the Nextel Cup.

Race results

Standings

References

Batman Begins 400
Batman Begins 400
Batman Begins 400
NASCAR races at Michigan International Speedway